Cambridge University Handball Club (CUHC) was founded and registered as a club at the University of Cambridge in 2013. CUHC runs competitive men’s and women's teams playing in national competitions. It is a member of the England Handball Association and the Association of British University Handball Clubs. Both the men's and the women's teams are currently holding their Varisity Trophy against Oxford (2020).

Squad

Men's team

Women's team

Competitions

British University Championships
The club has been taking part in the British University Championships. The men's team participated in the 2013/14 season (5th place), 2014/15 season (1st place, British University Champions) and 2015/16 season. The women's team played for the first time in the 2014/15 season (3rd place in plate finals) and continued in the 2015/16 season (1st place in plate finals).

Varsity

The first season of existence of the club saw the inaugural Handball Varsity match, which took place on 25 January 2014 at SportHouse in London. 

In 2020, the Cambridge Men's team won the Varsity match in the fifth subsequent year. At the same time, the Cambridge Women's team reclaimed the trophy for the first time since five years from Oxford's Women who had been unbeaten in Varsity since 2015.

References

External links
 Cambridge University HC – Official website
 Cambridge University Students' Union – Societies directory
 England Handball Association
 Association of British University Handball Clubs

Handball Club
Handball Club
English handball clubs